Lina Franziska Fehrmann (born in Dresden on 11 October 1900; died 10 June 1950) was an artist model generally called Fränzi and associated with Die Brücke. Her role in their work has occasionally been deemed unsettling.

References 

 
German artists' models
German Expressionism
People from Dresden
1900 births
1950 deaths